Demon Slayer: Kimetsu no Yaiba – The Hinokami Chronicles is a 3D fighting, action-adventure game developed by CyberConnect2. Based on the 2019 anime adaptation of Koyoharu Gotouge's manga series, Demon Slayer: Kimetsu no Yaiba, the game was released by Aniplex in Japan, and globally by Sega, for Microsoft Windows, PlayStation 4, PlayStation 5, Xbox One and Xbox Series X/S in October 2021. It also was released for Nintendo Switch in June 2022.

Overview
Adapted from the events of the first season of the anime series, along with Demon Slayer: Kimetsu no Yaiba the Movie: Mugen Train, the game's single player story mode follows Tanjiro Kamado, the series' protagonist, as he joins the Demon Slayer Corps and faces off against various demons in order to turn his sister Nezuko, who has become a demon, back into a human. The story features some exploration elements, and is told through various cutscenes and boss battles with demons seen in the anime series. The Hinokami Chronicles also features a versus mode, where players form teams of two fighters from the roster and battle CPU opponents or other people. The game supports both local and online multiplayer.

Characters
The game launched with 18 slayers, including six who appeared in the spin-off anime Chuukou Ikkan!! Kimetsu Gakuen Monogatari. 13 additional fighters were later added as downloadable content, for a total of 31.

 Tanjiro Kamado
 Nezuko Kamado
 Sakonji Urokodaki
 Makomo
 Sabito
 Zenitsu Agatsuma
 Inosuke Hashibira
 Murata
 Giyu Tomioka
 Shinobu Kocho
 Kyojuro Rengoku
 Hinokami Tanjiro Kamado
 Academy Tanjiro Kamado
 Academy Nezuko Kamado
 Academy Zenitsu Agatsuma
 Academy Inosuke Urokodaki
 Academy Giyu Tomioka
 Academy Shinobu Kocho
 Rui (DLC)
 Akaza (DLC)
 Yahaba (DLC)
 Susamaru (DLC)
 Enmu (DLC)
 Yushiro & Tamayo (DLC)
 Tengen Uzui (Paid DLC)
 Nezuko Kamado (Awakened Form) (Paid DLC)
 Tanjiro Kamado (Entertainment District Arc) (Paid DLC)
 Zenitsu Agatsuma (Entertainment District Arc) (Paid DLC)
 Inosuke Hashibira (Entertainment District Arc) (Paid DLC)
 Daki (Paid DLC)
 Gyutaro (Paid DLC)

Development
The game was first announced in March 2020. It was to be published by Aniplex for the PlayStation 4; the company previously produced the 2019 anime adaptation. Later that month, first footage was shown, along with the announcement that the game, titled Kimetsu no Yaiba Hinokami Keppūtan, will be developed by CyberConnect2, the company known for developing the Naruto: Ultimate Ninja series. Following months of development, the game was re-announced via the issue of Weekly Shōnen Jump to be a multiplatform arena fighting game for the PlayStation 4, PlayStation 5, Xbox One, Xbox Series X/S and Microsoft Windows. Ufotable, the animation studio behind the anime series, has produced several key illustrations for the game.

The Hinokami Chronicles received three free post-launch DLC, each with two new characters. The first, announced in October 2021, and released in November 2021, added Akaza and Rui, the first playable antagonists in the game. An  Additional Character Pack, released in 2022, added seven characters from the Entertainment District Arc as paid DLC. A Nintendo Switch version was released in Japan on June 9, 2022, and worldwide the following day.

Reception 

Demon Slayer: Kimetsu no Yaiba – The Hinokami Chronicles received "mixed or average" reviews for most platforms according to review aggregator Metacritic; the Xbox Series X/S version received "generally favorable" reviews. The PlayStation 4 version of Demon Slayer: Kimetsu no Yaiba – The Hinokami Chronicles was the bestselling retail game during its first week of release in Japan, with 94,849 physical copies being sold. The PlayStation 5 also version sold 20,187 copies during the same week, making it the second bestselling retail game in the country. As of December 2021, the game has sold over 1.32 million copies worldwide.

Notes

References

External links

2021 video games
3D fighting games
CyberConnect2 games
Demon Slayer: Kimetsu no Yaiba
Nintendo Switch games
PlayStation 4 games
PlayStation 5 games
Sega video games
Taishō period in fiction
Unreal Engine games
Video games about demons
Video games about ninja
Video games based on anime and manga
Video games with cel-shaded animation
Windows games
Xbox One games
Xbox Series X and Series S games
Video games developed in Japan
Multiplayer and single-player video games